Admonishing the Bishops is an EP by the band Thinking Fellers Union Local 282, released as a CD and 10" vinyl record on October 26, 1993, through Matador Records. The EP's title refers to Alan and Rick Bishop of the Sun City Girls with whom the Thinking Fellers had toured with the previous year.

Track listing

Personnel 
Thinking Fellers Union Local 282
Mark Davies – guitar, bass guitar, banjo, vocals
Anne Eickelberg – bass guitar, vocals
Brian Hageman – guitar, mandolin, vocals
Jay Paget – drums
Hugh Swarts – guitar, vocals
Production and additional personnel
Gibbs Chapman – mixing, recording
Thinking Fellers Union Local 282 – production, mixing, recording
Lexa Walsh – illustrations
Bob Weston – production, engineering

References

External links 
 

1993 EPs
Matador Records EPs
Thinking Fellers Union Local 282 albums